Emmanuelle Sykora (born 21 February 1976 in Pau) is a French women's international footballer who plays as a defender. She is a member of the France women's national football team. She was part of the team at the UEFA Women's Euro 1997, UEFA Women's Euro 2001 and 2003 FIFA Women's World Cup.

References

External links
 
 

1976 births
Living people
French women's footballers
France women's international footballers
Sportspeople from Pau, Pyrénées-Atlantiques
2003 FIFA Women's World Cup players
Women's association football defenders
Footballers from Nouvelle-Aquitaine